

History
NZ Performance Car TV was a free-to-air television program that ran for eight series, produced in-house by Parkside Media. It has had airtime on TV ONE, TV2, TV3, Prime and Sky Sports, often with several networks simultaneously which is unique in its genre. Each series consists of 13 episodes. Two series were screened per year. It was also available via TVNZ ondemand.

First airing in 2004 the series evolved to match the changing tastes of the import car scene. Series 8 had a large focus on drifting.

The show builds on the NZ Performance Car magazine brand, featuring similar content.

Show content

Drifting
Drag racing
Import car culture
Event coverage
Driver interviews
Modified car features
Tech and tuning tips
Competitions

The show's content reflects the seasonal nature of the scene in New Zealand. Series filmed in winter tend to feature more modified cars and less motorsport; series filmed in summer feature more motorsport and less modified cars.

Series overview

The series has endured much criticism because of its niche nature, including presenters and their ties to the scene, content choice and timeslots (each series had a different timeslot and sometimes a different channel or network).

Series 8
Series 8 saw a return to a regular timeslot within Sunday afternoon's Powerbuilt Tools Motorsport on TV ONE, with a longer more adult-themed show which aired late night on TV2.
Presenters Dan Gibson and Craig ‘Puka’ Linn.

Series 7
Series 7 featured  Geoffrey Bell  as the main presenter.

Series 6
Series 6 featured Geoffrey Bell as the main presenter.

Series 5
Series 5 featured well-known TV presenter Brooke Howard-Smith. As Howard-Smith is a TV3 presenter, when NZ Performance Car TV moved to TVNZ for Series 6, he was replaced.

Series 4
Frank Liew returned to present series 4

Series 3
Frank Liew, noted Auto Salon judge with deep involvement in the import car scene, presented series 3.

Series 2
Presented by Todd Wylie and Dan Philips

Series 1
Presented by Anna Jobsz and Danny Codling

Controversy
NZ Performance Car TV, like NZ Performance Car magazine has typically been criticised by groups not in favour of import car culture, or those concerned about ‘boy racer’ activity.

Series 8 focused much more on motorsport, covering the NZ Drift Series in New Zealand, drifting overseas, drag racing in New Zealand and Australia (e.g. Jamboree 18 from Willowbank Raceway and Super Lap from Taupo Motorsport Park), including interviews with and profiles of drivers such as Daniel Woolhouse and Carl Ruiterman. Feature cars and other event coverage were still present, but the increased focus on motorsport marked a divergence from NZ Performance Car magazine content.

Production and crew
Series 1-4 were produced and directed by Graham Ralphs. Series 5 onwards were produced by Iain Eggleton

External links
 Performance Car TV forum
 Performance Car TV website

References

Automotive television series
2004 New Zealand television series debuts
Prime (New Zealand TV channel) original programming
Three (TV channel) original programming
TVNZ 2 original programming